Kenichi Hirai (born 19 March 1950) is a Japanese former professional tennis player.

Biography
Hirai, who was born in Tokyo, was a six-time doubles champion at the All Japan Tennis Championships.

Debuting in 1973, Hirai featured in a total 19 Davis Cup ties for Japan and won 21 matches overall, 11 in singles and 10 in doubles.

Hirai won two medals at the 1973 Summer Universiade in Moscow, a bronze in the singles and silver in the mixed doubles.

In 1974 he became the Asian Games doubles champion with Toshiro Sakai and teamed up with the same player to reach the quarter-finals of the French Open that year.

Hirai didn't turn professional until the late 1970s.

Grand Prix career finals

Doubles: 1 (0–1)

See also
List of Japan Davis Cup team representatives

References

External links
 
 
 

1950 births
Living people
Japanese male tennis players
Sportspeople from Tokyo
Universiade medalists in tennis
Asian Games gold medalists for Japan
Asian Games medalists in tennis
Medalists at the 1974 Asian Games
Tennis players at the 1974 Asian Games
Universiade silver medalists for Japan
Universiade bronze medalists for Japan
Medalists at the 1973 Summer Universiade
20th-century Japanese people
21st-century Japanese people